MAT deficiency is a name used to describe two unrelated metabolic disorders:

Beta-ketothiolase deficiency
Hypermethioninemia